This is a list of tennis players who have represented the Kazakhstan Davis Cup team in an official Davis Cup match. Kazakhstan have taken part in the competition since 1995.

Players

References

Lists of Davis Cup tennis players
Davis Cup